Laxmikant Berde (26 October 1954 – 16 December 2004) was an Indian Marathi language film actor who appeared in Marathi and Hindi movies. Known for his highly energetic slapstick performances, Berde started his career as an employee in the production company Mumbai Marathi Sahitya Sangh and then played supporting roles in a few Marathi stage plays. In 1983–84, he first became famous with the Marathi play Tur Tur.

Apart from Marathi movies, his comedy stage plays like Shantecha Karta Chalu Aahe and Bighadale Swargache Dwaar were also successful. Berde acted in around 185 Bollywood and Marathi films and received four Nominations for Filmfare Award for Best Performance in a Comic Role.

Early life
Berde was born on 26 October 1954 in Bombay (Mumbai). He had five older siblings and would sell lottery tickets as a child to append to the family income. His participation in stage dramas during the cultural activities for Ganesh festival celebrations performed at Girgaon got him interested in acting. He won awards for participation in inter-school and inter-college drama competitions. Following this, Berde started working at the Mumbai Marathi Sahitya Sangh.

Career
While working as an employee in the Marathi Sahitya Sangh, Berde started acting in small roles in Marathi stage plays. In 1983–84, he acquired his first major role in Purshottam Berde's Marathi stage play Tur Tur which became a hit and Berde's style of comedy was appreciated.

Berde made his movie debut with the 1984 Marathi movie Lek Chalali Sasarla. Subsequently, he and actor Mahesh Kothare starred together in the films Dhoom Dhadaka (1984) and De Danadan (1987). Both these movies became famous and helped Berde establish his trademark comedy style.

In most movies, he starred either alongside Kothare or with actor Ashok Saraf. The Berde-Saraf pair is recognized to be a successful lead-actor pairing in Indian cinema. Berde, along with Ashok Saraf, Sachin Pilgaonkar and Mahesh Kothare formed a successful quartet in Marathi films after acting together in the 1989 Marathi film Ashi Hi Banwa Banwi. That decade will be best remembered by the Marathi film industry as the "Ashok-Lakshya" era. Both actors remained best friends until Berde died. In most movies, Berde was paired with actress and his future wife Priya Arun.

Berde's first Hindi film was Sooraj Barjatya's Maine Pyar Kiya starring Salman Khan in 1989. Some of his other popular Hindi films include Hum Aapke Hain Koun..!, Mere Sapno Ki Rani, Aarzoo, Saajan, Beta, 100 Days and Anari. Berde also kept working as the lead actor in hit Marathi stage plays like Shantecha Karta Chalu Aahe and others.

In 1992, Berde tried to break away from his comedy mould and acted in a serious role in the film Ek Hota Vidushak. However, the film was not a commercial success and Berde reverted to his trademark comedy, albeit disappointed with the film's failure.

From 1985 to 2000, Berde acted in many other Marathi blockbusters such as Amhi Doghe Raja Rani, Hamaal De Dhamaal, Balache Baap Brahmachari, Eka Peksha Ek, Bhutacha Bhau, Thartharat, Dhadakebaaz and Zapatlela.

Berde acted in the Marathi TV serials Nasti Aafat and "Gajra". Pachadlela (2004) was his last movie.

Death
Berde died in Mumbai on 16 December 2004 due to a kidney ailment. Many notable personalities from the Marathi film industry like Mahesh Kothare, Ashok Saraf and Sachin Pilgaonkar attended his funeral.

In the last years of his life, Berde ran his own production house Abhinay Arts, named after his son Abhinay Berde. Berde was a proficient ventriloquist and guitarist.

Filmography

Marathi films

Marathi plays

Hindi films

Dubbing artist

References

External links
 

1954 births
2004 deaths
Deaths from kidney failure
Indian male film actors
Marathi people
Male actors in Marathi cinema
20th-century Indian male actors
21st-century Indian male actors
Male actors from Mumbai